Elijah Luiz Madiclum Canlas (born August 16, 2000) is a Filipino actor and commercial model. He began his professional acting career in the 2014 independent film Sundalong Kanin, an official entry to Cinemalaya Philippine Independent Film Festival. He then rose to prominence for his award-winning performance in Kalel, 15 where he received Best Actor awards at 43rd Gawad Urian Awards, 68th FAMAS Awards, 17th Asian Film Festival in Rome, Italy, and 16th Harlem International Film Festival in Harlem, New York.

This film also bagged its director, Jun Robles Lana, the best director award at the Tallinn Black Nights Film Festival in Estonia.

In May 2020, he was cast as one of the main actors in the YouTube series, Gameboys. Produced by The IdeaFirst Company, it is a boys love (BL) series in the Philippines that tackles the story of two young men who find each other online amid the COVID-19 pandemic.

Along with Kokoy de Santos as Gavreel Alarcon, Elijah starred in the thirteen-part web series as Cairo Lazaro, an up-and-coming online game streamer.

In late 2020, Netflix released a re-cut version of the series, titled Gameboys Level-Up Edition.

To date, there are several groups supporting Canlas, among them are Elijah Nation Official Fans Club that was founded on June 1, 2020 and Sisterakas ni Jelo founded on February 21, 2021 and launched last March 21, 2021.

Early life and education 
Elijah Luiz Madiclum Canlas was born on August 16, 2000 in Manila, Philippines. He is the second son of Rommel Canlas and Lyn Canlas. Second of three siblings, he is fondly called "Jelo" by his older brother Jerom, and younger brother, JM. The Canlas brothers are all actors who played various roles in film, theater and television. With their mother being a ballerina, and theater actress in Bacolod, they were exposed to arts, and theater at a very young age.

Canlas finished grade school at Statefields School, a private institute located in Bacoor, Cavite. In Junior High School, he studied Theater Arts at the Philippine High School for the Arts and finished Senior High School at MINT College. He is currently taking up his Bachelor of Arts in Philippine Arts at the University of the Philippines Manila while continuously pursuing his acting career.

Career 
When he was 14 years old, he debuted as one of the four main characters in the film Sundalong Kanin (2014), a Cinemalaya entry directed by Janice O'Hara.

In 2014, he auditioned for the main role of Kalel, 15 when it was still titled Son of God, but got rejected because the role was supposed to be given to someone who resembles a mestizo son of a Spanish friar. Four years later in 2018, Canlas met with director Jun Robles Lana because he was looking for a talent manager. During the meeting, Lana suddenly said Canlas could play the lead in his next film as Kalel.

A year after portraying his role in the movie Edward (2019), his acting prowess won him Best Supporting Actor (PinakaPASADOng Katuwang na Aktor) from the Pampelikulang Samahan ng mga Dalubguro (PASADO), alongside other nominees such as Baron Geisler, Joross Gamboa and Ian Veneracion. He also won Best Acting Ensemble together with the other cast members of the movie Kalel, 15 (2020) in the 2020 PARAGON Critics Choice Awards.

On August 5, 2020, he bagged his first Best Actor award at the prestigious 17th Asian Film Festival in Rome, Italy for Kalel, 15. In December 22 of the same year, he was named by CNN as "Actor of the Year".

Filmography

Television

Web series

Film

Awards and nominations

References

External links

2000 births
Living people
Filipino male television actors
Filipino male film actors
21st-century Filipino male actors